Terrence Stubbs (born March 25, 1980 in Manassas, Virginia) is a former Arena Football League defensive back for the Los Angeles Avengers.

High School Years
Stubbs attended Oscar F. Smith High School in Chesapeake, Virginia and was a student and a letterman in football. In football, he won All-City and an All-District honors as a wide receiver.

College years
Stubbs attended Temple University, and was a good student and a letterman in football. In football, he finished his career with 65 receptions for 893 yards (13.74 yards per rec. avg.) and two touchdowns.

External links
Los Angeles Avengers' player profile
AFL stats

1980 births
Living people
Sportspeople from Chesapeake, Virginia
People from Manassas, Virginia
American football defensive backs
American football wide receivers
Temple Owls football players
New York Jets players
Berlin Thunder players
Los Angeles Avengers players